This is a list of notable people who committed suicide by setting themselves on fire for political reasons. Non-political self-immolations are not included in the list.

List

Before 1900

1940s

1950s

1960s

1970s

1980s

1990s

2000s

2010s

2020s

See also 
 2011 Algerian self-immolations
 Self-immolation protests by Tibetans in China

References

External links 
 "The Self Immolators" – a chronological list of biographies and last statements of known self immolators 1967 to 2013

 
self-immolations
Buddhist martyrs